The Deschutes River is a  river in the U.S. state of Washington. Its headwaters are in the Bald Hills in Lewis County, and it empties into Budd Inlet of Puget Sound at Olympia in Thurston County. It was given its name by French fur traders, who called it Rivière des Chutes, or "River of the Falls", a translation of the First Nations name for the site. (The city of Tumwater, founded in the same location, takes its name from the Chinook Jargon translation for "waterfall".)

Tributaries of the river include Spurgeon Creek, Thurston Creek and Lake Lawrence. There are numerous parks along its course, including Pioneer Park and Tumwater Falls Park. A popular tubing stretch runs from Pioneer Park to Tumwater Falls.

See also
List of rivers of Washington

References

Rivers of Washington (state)
Rivers of Thurston County, Washington
Rivers of Lewis County, Washington
Geography of Olympia, Washington